Boyle is an unincorporated community in Jefferson County, Kansas, United States.

History
A post office in Boyle opened in 1872, closed temporarily in 1882, reopened in 1884, and closed permanently in 1945.

References

Further reading

External links
 Jefferson County maps: Current, Historic, KDOT

Unincorporated communities in Jefferson County, Kansas
Unincorporated communities in Kansas